Alen Oroz  (born 6 September 1984) is an Austrian footballer playing for FC Lustenau 07 since 2009.

He had previously played with NK Široki Brijeg in the Premier League of Bosnia and Herzegovina.

External links
 

1984 births
Living people
Footballers from Vienna
Austrian footballers
Austrian expatriate footballers
Association football defenders
Wiener Sport-Club players
NK Široki Brijeg players
Expatriate footballers in Bosnia and Herzegovina
FC Lustenau players